Amber Laura Heard (born April 22, 1986) is an American actress, humanitarian and social activist. She had her first leading role in the horror film All the Boys Love Mandy Lane (2006), and went on to star in films such as The Ward (2010), Drive Angry (2011), and London Fields (2018). She has also had supporting roles in films including Pineapple Express (2008), Never Back Down (2008), The Joneses (2009), The Rum Diary (2011), Paranoia (2013), Machete Kills (2013), Magic Mike XXL (2015), and The Danish Girl (2015). Heard is part of the DC Extended Universe franchise, playing Mera in Justice League (2017), Aquaman (2018), and the forthcoming Aquaman and the Lost Kingdom (2023). She has also acted in television series such as Hidden Palms (2007) and The Stand (2020).

In 2016, Heard became a volunteer with the American Civil Liberties Union (ACLU) in the capacity of an ACLU Artist Ambassador, a role reserved for individuals who advocate for civil rights and civil liberties. Heard also served as a Human Rights Ambassador for the Office of the United Nations High Commissioner for Human Rights.    

Heard married actor Johnny Depp in 2015. The dissolution of the marriage in May 2016 garnered widespread media attention when Heard filed for a restraining order against Depp in which she alleged domestic violence. Depp later unsuccessfully sued, British tabloid newspaper The Sun in London for their publication of Heard's domestic abuse allegations. The judgement in the suit upheld 12 of the 14 allegations against Depp, who was subsequently refused leave to appeal. Depp filed another lawsuit, this time against Heard for an op-ed published in her name in the Washington Post discussing speaking up against "sexual violence" and becoming "a public figure representing domestic abuse" and stating that she witnessed "first-hand how institutions protect men accused of abuse." The lawsuitin response to which Heard filed her own countersuit over allegedly three defamatory statements made by Depp's lawyerbecame the subject of a televised and widely-publicized trial at the end of which the jury concluded that all three statements from Heard's op-ed were defamatory, and found that Depp's lawyer's first and third statements were not defamatory, while finding that the lawyer's second statement was defamatory. The judge ruled that Heard owed $10.35 million to Depp and that Depp owed Heard $2 million. Heard received backlash over her testimony, particularly on social media. Heard and Depp both appealed the Fairfax County Courthouse jury verdict in the Virginia lawsuit. Heard subsequently settled with Depp, with their lawyers announcing that Depp would receive $1 million in full settlement, the payment coming from Heard's insurer.

Early life
Heard was born in Austin, Texas, the middle child of three daughters of internet researcher Patricia Paige (née Parsons; 1956–2020) and construction company owner David Clinton Heard (born 1950). The family lived outside Austin. Heard's father trained horses in his free time, and she grew up riding horses, hunting, and fishing with him. She also participated in beauty pageants, although as an adult she has said that she could no longer "support the objectification". Raised Catholic, Heard began identifying as an atheist at the age of sixteen after her best friend died in a car crash. The following year, no longer comfortable in "conservative, God-fearin' Texas", Heard dropped out of her Catholic high school to pursue an acting career in Los Angeles. She eventually earned a diploma through a home-study course.

Career

2003–2007: Early roles
Heard's earliest acting work included appearances in two music videos, Kenny Chesney's "There Goes My Life" and Eisley's "I Wasn't Prepared", and small supporting roles in the television series Jack & Bobby (2004), The Mountain (2004), and The O.C. (2005). She made her film debut in a minor role in the sports drama Friday Night Lights (2004), followed by brief supporting roles in films Drop Dead Sexy (2005), North Country (2005), Side FX (2005), Price to Pay (2006), Alpha Dog (2006), and Spin (2007), and a guest-starring spot in an episode of the police procedural crime drama television series Criminal Minds. Heard received her first leading role in the unconventional slasher film All the Boys Love Mandy Lane, which premiered at the 2006 Toronto International Film Festival, but was not released in Europe until 2008 and in the US until 2013 due to distribution problems.

In 2007, Heard played the love interest of the main character in The CW's teen drama Hidden Palms, which the network aired to replace summer reruns of other series aimed at teenage audiences. The series premiered in the US in May 2007 to mixed reviews and poor ratings, leading the CW to air only eight of the planned 12 episodes before canceling it. The same year, Heard also appeared in the short movie Day 73 with Sarah, in the teen drama Remember the Daze, and in an episode of the Showtime series Californication.

2008–2016: Mainstream recognition

Heard gained mainstream recognition in 2008 with supporting roles in the Judd Apatow-produced stoner comedy Pineapple Express and the martial arts drama Never Back Down, both of which were box office successes. She also appeared as part of an ensemble cast in an adaptation of Bret Easton Ellis's novel The Informers (2008), but the film was a critical failure. The following year, Heard starred in The Joneses (2009) opposite David Duchovny and Demi Moore; Variety wrote that Heard "more or less steals the show" from Moore. Outside a brief appearance in the box office hit Zombieland (2009), Heard's other films during this time were either independent films that received only limited theatrical releaseExTerminators (2009), The River Why (2010), And Soon the Darkness (2010)or critically panned horror filmsThe Stepfather (2009), The Ward.

Heard's first film release in 2011 was Drive Angry, a supernatural action thriller in which she was paired with Nicolas Cage. The film received mainly bad reviews and underperformed commercially, but film critic Roger Ebert wrote that she "does everything that can possibly be done" with her character, a waitress who becomes entangled in an undead man's mission to save his daughter from a cult. In early 2011, Heard also appeared on the British television program Top Gear as a star in a reasonably priced car coming 33rd of 41 on their Cee'd leaderboard. Heard next starred in NBC's The Playboy Club, a crime drama series about the original Playboy Club in 1960s Chicago. After poor reviews and ratings as well as protests from both feminists and conservative groups, the series was canceled after only three episodes had aired. Heard's third role of 2011 was as the love interest of the main character, played by Johnny Depp, in the Hunter S. Thompson adaptation The Rum Diary (2011). The film was a commercial failure, grossing $30 million on a $45 million budget, and received mixed reviews. Heard's part was said to be underdeveloped. In 2011, Heard appeared in an advertisement campaign for the fashion brand Guess.

Heard next starred in the thriller Paranoia (2013), the exploitation film Machete Kills (2013) and the satire Syrup (2013), none of which were critical or commercial successes. The year also saw the US limited release of All the Boys Love Mandy Lane. Although the film's reviews were overall mixed to negative, Heard's performance was deemed her "most definitive to date" by the Los Angeles Times and "psychologically interesting" by The Washington Post. In 2014, Heard appeared in a supporting role in the commercially successful action-thriller 3 Days to Kill.

In 2015, Heard had a prominent supporting role in the comedy-drama Magic Mike XXL, playing the love interest of the film's protagonist, Channing Tatum. Like its predecessor, the film was a large box office success. Heard also had a small supporting role in Tom Hooper's period drama The Danish Girl (2015), and a starring role opposite James Franco and Ed Harris in the independent crime thriller The Adderall Diaries (2015). IndieWire stated that although Heard was "miscast" in The Adderrall Diaries, she "displays much potential and has succeeded in a bid to be taken more seriously". Her fourth role in 2015 was opposite Christopher Walken in the television film One More Time, which aired on Starz. For her role as a struggling singer-songwriter, she took singing lessons and learned to play piano and guitar. The Los Angeles Times called her performance "superb" and The Film Stage stated that Heard did an "admirable job". The actress also appeared in a November 2015 episode of the American automotive reality series Overhaulin', in which her Mustang received a makeover. It also featured the cast pranking Heard at the behest of Depp.

Heard played the female lead in London Fields, an adaptation of Martin Amis's novel about a clairvoyant femme fatale who knows she will be murdered. It premiered at the 2015 Toronto International Film Festival. Shortly after the screening, the film was pulled from release due to disagreements between its director and producers, and due to litigation. Heard was sued for $10 million for allegedly breaching performance and promotional obligations. The actress countersued, claiming the producers had violated a nudity rider in her contract. In September 2018, a settlement was reached, and the film was finally released. It received highly negative reviews, and Heard later stated that "it was one of the most difficult movies to film and it has proven to continue to be difficult ... I can't say I did [the character] justice". Jane Mulkerrins of The Daily Telegraph wrote that Heard provided "a decent enough turn as the enigmatic [Nicola Six]" that still could not save the adaptation, while Peter Sobczynski of RogerEbert.com said that she "just does not project the kind of mystery and allure" that the character requires. In 2019, Heard's performance in the film received a nomination for the Golden Raspberry Award for Worst Actress.

2017–present: DC Extended Universe and other projects
 In 2017, Heard appeared as part of an ensemble cast in Lake Bell's indie comedy I Do... Until I Don't and joined the DC Extended Universe (DCEU) cast as Mera, a princess of an Atlantean kingdom, in the superhero film Justice League. She reprised the role the following year in Aquaman, which co-starred Jason Momoa and marked Heard's first major role in a studio film. She cited Mera's trait of being "a strong, independent, self-possessed superhero in her own right" as one of the reasons for her attraction to the role, who rejects being called Aquawoman instead of by her own name. Aquaman received mixed reviews. It was a commercial success, grossing over $1 billion. The Chicago Tribunes Michael Phillips and The Independents Geoffrey Macnab respectively noted that Heard "lends a blasé air of early '50s B-movie cheese" and that she "camps it up entertainingly" as Mera. That same year, Heard was appointed global ambassador for cosmetics brand L'Oréal Paris.

In 2019, Heard had supporting roles in the independent dramas Her Smell and Gully. Her only project released in 2020 was The Stand, a miniseries based on Stephen King's novel of the same name. She played Nadine Cross, a school teacher who is among the few survivors of an apocalyptic plague. It premiered on CBS All Access in December 2020, with the series finale airing in February 2021. In 2021, Heard reprised her role as Mera in the superhero film Zack Snyder's Justice League, a director's cut of the 2017 film, for which she had also filmed new scenes.

Heard is set to star in Aquaman and the Lost Kingdom (2023), a sequel to Aquaman. An online petition to remove Heard from the film began following her ex-husband Depp's loss in his UK libel case and his replacement in the Fantastic Beasts films in 2020. The petition "alleges that Heard lied about her accusations against Depp and is herself 'a known and proven domestic abuser'". Heard described the campaign as "paid rumors and paid campaigns on social media", and the film's co-producer, Peter Safran, confirmed that Heard would appear in the sequel. By the start of the 2022 Depp v. Heard trial in the US, the petition had reached 2 million signatures. In her testimony, Heard stated that she "'fought really hard to stay in the movie' but that 'they didn't want to include me in the film' and only shot a 'very pared-down version' of her part". DC Films president Walter Hamada, who testified for Depp, stated that they had considered recasting Mera but that it was due to concerns over Heard's chemistry with Momoa rather than the abuse allegations. Hamada also said that the role's reduced capacity in the sequel was because the film had always intended to focus on the relationship between Momoa and Patrick Wilson's characters. Heard is also attached to appear in Conor Allyn's forthcoming period drama, In the Fire.

Charity and activism
In 2012, Heard worked with Amnesty International on a bilingual campaign to raise awareness of American immigration policy at the Mexico-United States border.

In August 2016, Heard pledged to donate her $7 million divorce settlement with Johnny Depp to the American Civil Liberties Union (ACLU) and Children's Hospital Los Angeles (CHLA). Later that year in November 2016, she issued a statement defending this pledge against allegations from TMZdespite the fact that Depp had not yet finished paying the $7 million to herthat she had not yet made the donations as she had pledged. Depp finished paying the full $7 million divorce settlement to Heard by October 2018. By then, CHLA had already recognized Heard as one of their donors by officially including her in their "Honor Roll of Donors" list for the fiscal year 2017. In the following year in 2019, they likewise included her in their donors list for the fiscal year 2018.

In January 2021, the Daily Mail reported an allegation made by Depp's lawyers that Heard had yet to complete her donations.
In response to this claim, Heard's lawyer stated that Heard intends to "eventually fulfill her pledge" in full but has "been delayed in that goal because Mr. Depp filed a lawsuit against her, and consequently, she has been forced to spend millions of dollars." Subsequently, media outlets reported on past statements by Heard. During an appearance in the Dutch television talk show RTL Late Night in October 2018, Heard said she "donated" $7 million to the ACLU and CHLA. In her February 2020 testimony in the Depp v News Group Newspapers Ltd case in the UK, Heard stated that she had "donated" the "entire amount" of her divorce settlement to charity.

In the Depp v. Heard trial in 2022, the corporate designee of CHLA testified that as of 2021, Heard had paid $250,000 to them. In a December 2021 testimony previously used in the trial, the ACLU's chief operating officer testified that the organization expected the pledged money to come in over a 10-year period and that Heard had made no contributions since 2018. To that time, the ACLU had received a total of $1.3 million between 2016 and 2018, of which $350,000 was directly from Heard, $500,000 from a donor advised fund believed to be of Elon Musk, $350,000 from another donor advised fund and $100,000 directly from Depp as part of the settlement. In 2019, the ACLU learned that Heard was "having financial problems and could not fulfill the remainder of the pledge." Heard testified that defending the case had cost her more than $6 million in legal fees. She also testified that the donation by Musk on her behalf did not count towards the final $3.5 million that she had pledged to donate and that she plans to resume her donations when she can.

In November 2016, Heard was filmed for a public service announcement (PSA) on domestic violence for the #GirlGaze Project. In the PSA, she spoke about the importance of women helping each other and reminded those women affected by violence against women (VAW) that they are not alone while also encouraging them to "speak up." She also highlighted the importance of taking responsibility for how VAW is dealt with and talked about "in the media and in our culture" with the aim of making it easier for survivors to come forward and to stand up for themselves. She echoed similar sentiments in a letter addressed to "[her] silent sisters everywhere" and published in the December 2016 issue of Porter magazine. In the letter, she wrote, among other things, that "No matter how terrible or terrifying surviving trauma may be, unfortunately it can pale in comparison to what follows" and that "It isn’t easy to raise your voice, to stand up for yourself and your truth and to do it ‘alone’." Furthermore, she assured "every woman who is suffering in silence" that "you are not alone" and that "You may not see us, but we are there. Your sisters are everywhere... and we are with you."

In an interview for The Economist's Pride and Prejudice event in March 2017 in which Heard discussed her position as an openly and activist "sexually fluid" woman, she highlighted the underrepresentation of LGBTQ characters in the Hollywood film industry (henceforth referred to as Hollywood). Furthermore, Heard talked about the importance of more gay men coming out in Hollywood because, she explained, this would go a long way towards making the industry more LGBTQ-inclusive. Later that same year in August, Heard produced a short video for The Economist in which she spoke about the gender pay gap in Hollywood and the underrepresentation of women in the industry.

In April 2018, Heard joined the Syrian American Medical Society (SAMS) on a multi-specialty medical mission to the Al-Zaatari Refugee Camp in Jordan as a Goodwill Ambassador. While there, she met a 12-year-old girl named Weam who had thalassemia and needed expensive life-sustaining drugs and blood transfusions. She henceforth partnered with SAMS to help raise needed funds to aid Weam and 12 other children in the camp with thalassemia afford the costs of their treatments and to raise awareness about SAMS' humanitarian medical activities in Jordan.

In the same year, Heard accepted an invitation from ACLU to become an ACLU Artist Ambassador in the capacity of which she aided ACLU's efforts in their activism for justice in gender issues. She also accepted ACLU's invitation to work with them on an op-ed to highlight sexual assault and domestic violence issues. The result of this collaboration was the op-ed that was first published by The Washington Post in her name on December 18, 2018 and that was republished by ACLU on December 27, 2018. It is this op-ed for which Depp sued her in late February/early March 2019 alleging that it had defamed him.

Heard was one of the speakers at the United Nations's 9th Annual Social Good Summit in September 2018. In her talk, she spoke about her history of volunteer and activist work starting from her childhood school days to her more contemporary work with SAMS. She also highlighted the centrality of humans and of human connections in human activities and passionately spoke about the significance of fairness and justice as embodied in the Universal Declaration of Human Rights. Ahead of the 70th anniversary for the drafting of the Universal Declaration of Human Rights, Heard gave a speech, in October 2018, for the HagueTalks event 'Imagine the World We Want'. Later that same year in a week in November, Heard travelled to Mexico and visited several programs by Smile Train. In her visits, she met with several children with cleft lips and palate that Smile Train was providing medical assistance to and also met with the children's families and the doctors that were offering the assistance to the children.

In February 2019, Heard joined SAMS on a medical mission to Lebanon targeting Syrian refugee women living in poverty and in need of medical care. While on the mission, she visited several informal settlements in Beka'a Valley including Al-Omaria. She also partnered with SAMS to help raise funds to establish psychosocial programs, to increase access to educational programs, and to provide vocational training, all to mostly widowed women and orphaned children in these settlements.

Heard was a Human Rights Champion for the Stand Up for Human Rights campaign by the Office of the United Nations High Commissioner for Human Rights. In May 2019, she gave a speech in support of the SHIELD Act on Capitol Hill, discussing her experience of having had her private nude photos hacked and distributed online without her consent during the 2014 celebrity nude photo leak. In November 2019, Heard wrote an op-ed in The New York Times in which she contested that, "revenge porn is the wrong name" as "the perpetrator disclosed the images" even though "the victim did not consent to the disclosure." Heard further argued that, "Because the patchwork of state laws fails to truly protect intimate privacy, it is vital that Congress pass legislation that does." In the same month, Heard, together with Nico Tortorella and DC Comics, were awarded for "their activism and commitment to disenfranchised youth" at the 2019 Emery Awards organized by the Hetrick-Martin Institute.

Prior to the 2020 United States presidential election, Heard appeared in an election ad created by artist Marilyn Minter in support of Planned Parenthood, and participated in the VoteRiders #IDCheck Challenge on social media.

Personal life

Heard publicly came out in 2010, but has stated, "I don't label myself one way or another – I have had successful relationships with men and now a woman. I love who I love; it's the person that matters."

Heard was in a relationship with photographer Tasya van Ree from 2008 to 2012. Heard had her last name legally changed to van Ree during the relationship and reverted to her birth name in 2014. In 2009, Heard was arrested for misdemeanor domestic violence at Seattle–Tacoma International Airport, Washington state after allegedly hitting van Ree. Heard appeared the next day in King County District Court, Seattle but was not charged. The arrest was made public in 2016 during Heard's divorce proceedings from actor Johnny Depp. A statement was then issued by Heard's publicist in which van Ree said that Heard had been "wrongfully" accused and that the incident had been "misinterpreted and over-sensationalized", while also recalling "hints of misogynistic attitudes toward us which later appeared to be homophobic when they found out we were domestic partners and not just 'friends'" and adding that Heard and her "shared 5 wonderful years together and remain close to this day." The female officer who conducted the arrest—herself a lesbian—subsequently posted on Facebook to say, "I am so not homophobic or misogynistic! The arrest was made because an assault occurred (I witnessed it)."

Heard was one of the victims of the 2014 celebrity nude photo leak, in which "more than 50 of [her] personal photos were stolen and released to the public" with Heard later both speaking and writing against such breaches of privacy.

Following her divorce from Johnny Depp, Heard dated tech entrepreneur and Tesla CEO and shareholder Elon Musk for a year, until early 2018. She later had a relationship with actress and cinematographer Bianca Butti from January 2020 to December 2021.

In April 2021, Heard had her first child, a daughter, via surrogacy.

Relationship with Johnny Depp

Heard first met actor Johnny Depp in 2009 when she was cast in The Rum Diary opposite him. According to reports, the couple began dating in 2012 and were married in a civil ceremony in February 2015.

Australian customs incident 
In April 2015, Heard and Depp breached Australia's biosecurity laws when they failed to declare in customs the two dogs accompanying them when they flew into Queensland, where Depp was working on a film. In May 2015, the dogs were flown out of the country hours before a euthanasia deadline. Later in July of the same year, only Heard was charged for this breach in the laws. 

By December 2015 the case had been adjourned four times with Heard having instructed her lawyers to enter not guilty pleas and stating that she was "looking forward" to fighting the charges. In the court case in April 2016, Heard pleaded guilty to falsifying quarantine documents, stating that she had made a mistake due to sleep deprivation. While criminal charges were dropped, she was placed on a A$1,000 (US$) one-month good behaviour bond for producing a false document; Heard and Depp released a video apologizing for their behavior and urging others to adhere to biosecurity laws.

Divorce

Heard filed for divorce from Depp in May 2016 and obtained a temporary restraining order against him, releasing a statement saying that, "During the entirety of our relationship, Johnny has been verbally and physically abusive to me. I endured excessive emotional, verbal and physical abuse from Johnny, which has included angry, hostile, humiliating and threatening assaults to me whenever I questioned his authority or disagreed with him." In response Depp's council said that, "Amber is attempting to secure a premature financial resolution by alleging abuse", and that, "He is unable to attend the hearing on this matter and has not heard Amber's specific allegations against him. He nonetheless has every intention of staying away from Amber and will stipulate to mutual stay-away and personal conduct orders."

A ruling on the scale of the settlement was achieved in August 2016, and Heard pledged to donate the proceeds equally between the ACLU and CHLA. Heard dropped her request for a continued restraining order, and they issued a joint statement saying that their "relationship was intensely passionate and at times volatile, but always bound by love. Neither party has made false accusations for financial gain. There was never any intent of physical or emotional harm". The final terms of the settlement were agreed in January 2017 with Depp being required to complete the payment of $7 million to Heard by February 2018, contribute $500,000 towards Heard's attorneys fees, and to give Heard custody of their two dogs, a horse and two cars. Depp was to retain all his real estate assets and 42 vehicles; no spousal support would be paid by either party. In her 2022 testimony, Heard stated that because they had no pre-nuptial agreement, she would have been entitled to half of Depp's earnings of $65 million during the marriage had she requested it.

Depp v News Group Newspapers Ltd

In June 2018, Depp brought a libel lawsuit in the United Kingdom against News Group Newspapers (NGN), the company publishing The Sun, which had labeled him a "wife beater" in an April 2018 article. Heard was a key witness for NGN during the highly publicized trial in July 2020.
In November 2020, the presiding judge found that Depp had lost his claim and that "the great majority of alleged assaults of Ms. Heard by Mr. Depp [12 out of the 14] have been proved to the civil standard". The court rejected Depp's claim of a hoax, and accepted that the allegations Heard had made against Depp had damaged her career and activism. Depp's appeal to overturn the verdict was rejected in March 2021.

Depp v. Heard

In February 2019, Depp sued Heard for defamation over a December 2018 op-ed for The Washington Post. In the lawsuit, Depp alleged that the op-ed contained three defamatory statements, the first of which was a headline:

 "Amber Heard: I spoke up against sexual violence — and faced our culture's wrath. That has to change."
 "Then two years ago, I became a public figure representing domestic abuse, and I felt the full force of our culture's wrath for women who speak out."
 "I had the rare vantage point of seeing, in real time, how institutions protect men accused of abuse."

Depp also alleged that Heard had been the one who abused him, and that her allegations constituted a hoax against him.

In August 2020, Heard filed a counterclaim against Depp, alleging that he had coordinated "a harassment campaign via Twitter and [by] orchestrating online petitions to get her fired from Aquaman and L'Oréal." Ultimately, Heard's counterclaim went to trial over three allegations that Depp had defamed her through statements made by his then-lawyer, Adam Waldman, published in the Daily Mail in April 2020, where Waldman stated:

 "Heard and her friends in the media used fake sexual violence allegations as both sword and shield", publicizing a "sexual violence hoax" against Depp.
 ...in one incident at a penthouse, "Amber and her friends spilled a little wine and roughed the place up, got their stories straight under the direction of a lawyer and publicist, and then placed a second call to 911" as "an ambush, a hoax" against Depp.
 ...there had been an "abuse hoax" by Heard against Depp.

The Depp-Heard trial took place in Fairfax County, Virginia between April 11 and June 1, 2022. The verdict was that for Depp's lawsuit, the jury found that all three statements from Heard's op-ed were false, defamed Depp, and were made with actual malice, so the jury awarded Depp $10 million in compensatory damages and $5 million in punitive damages from Heard. The punitive damages were reduced to $350,000 due to a limit imposed by Virginia state law. For Heard's counterclaim, the jury found that Waldman's first and third statements to the Daily Mail had not been proven to be defamatory, while finding that Waldman's second statement to the Daily Mail was false, defamatory and made with actual malice. As a result, Heard was awarded $2 million in compensatory damages and zero in punitive damages from Depp.

Over the course of the trial, online public sentiment was seen as highly negative towards Heard, there was a perception that she was less than truthful in her testimony which was mocked widely. Heard said she was "harassed, humiliated, threatened every single day" and described online criticism of her testimony as "agonizing". After the trial, Heard said she did not "blame" the jury for the verdict, because Depp was a "fantastic actor" and "people feel they know him". An interviewer hypothesised that the jury had not believed Heard's testimony and evidence, Heard questioned how the jury could believe her after "listening to three-and-a-half weeks of testimony about how I was a non-credible person".

The day after the verdict was read, Heard's lawyer, Elaine Bredehoft, told interviewers that Heard could not afford to pay the damages owed to Depp and would appeal the verdict. A month later, one of Heard's insurance providers, New York Marine, sued Heard in federal court, wanting to avoid paying up to $1 million for her legal defense fees in the Virginia case, arguing that the "jury's factual findings establish that Heard's liability is caused by the willful act(s) of Heard", hence New York Marine is "not liable" for the loss.

After they filed to appeal the verdict, Depp and Heard settled the case in December, 2022, with Heard publicly stating that even if her appeal succeeds, she "simply cannot go through" a retrial, while maintaining that the settlement was "not an act of concession." Meanwhile, Depp's lawyers stated that the "jury's unanimous decision and the resulting judgement in Mr. Depp's favor against Ms. Heard remain fully in place," and that the settlement would result in $1 million being paid to Depp by Heard's insurer, which "Depp is pledging and will donate to charities."

Filmography

Film

Television

Music videos

Awards and nominations

Notes

References

External links

 
 
 
 

1986 births
Living people
21st-century American actresses
Activists from Texas
Actresses from Austin, Texas
American Civil Liberties Union people
American film actresses
American human rights activists
American television actresses
American atheists
21st-century atheists
Former Roman Catholics
American LGBT actors
LGBT actresses
LGBT people from Texas
Johnny Depp
L'Oréal people